Vasula is a small borough in Tartu Parish, Tartu County, in southern Estonia. Vasula is situated on the left bank of the Amme river. As of 2011 Census, the population of Vasula was 273.

Vasula was first mentioned in 1220 in the Livonian Chronicle of Henry as Wasala.

Vasula gained its small borough rights in 2013, before that it was a village.

Since 1997, a rock music festival Amme Rock is held annually in Vasula.

There is a lake called Vasula Lake in the neighbouring village of Lombi, just south of Vasula.

Vasula Manor
Vasula Manor was first mentioned in 1446 as Wazel. In 1636, the manor was obtained by Swedish philosopher, poet and scientist Georg Stiernhielm (1598–1672). It remained in the possession of the Stiernhielm family for 170 years. In the 18th century the manor was owned by the Sheremetevs for dozen years.

References

External links
Amme Rock, rock festival held annually in Vasula
Vasula aed, plant nursery located in vasula

Villages in Tartu County
Boroughs and small boroughs in Estonia
Kreis Dorpat